The Gladstone Pottery Museum is a working museum of a medium-sized coal-fired pottery, typical of those once common in the North Staffordshire area of England from the time of the industrial revolution in the 18th century  to the mid 20th century. It is a grade II* listed building.

The museum is located in Longton, Stoke-on-Trent, Staffordshire.
It is also included in one of the regional routes of the European Route of Industrial Heritage.
Despite the name of the museum, it is a complex of buildings from two works, the Gladstone and the Roslyn. The protected features include the kilns. As there are fewer than 50 surviving bottle ovens in Stoke-on-Trent (and only a scattering elsewhere in the UK), the museum's kilns along with others in the Longton conservation area represent a significant proportion of the national stock of the structures.

History
A pottery factory first opened on the site in 1787. It was run by the Shelley family who produced earthenware and decorated plates and dishes produced by Josiah Wedgwood in Etruria. The site was purchased in 1789 by William Ward who split it into two pot banks: the Park Place Works subsequently named the Roslyn works, and the Wards Pot Bank which was sold to John Hendley Sheridan in 1818. In the 1850s Sheridan had rented out the site to Thomas Cooper who  employed 41 adults and 26 children to produce china and parian figures.
  
By 1876 the Wards site had passed into the hands of R. Hobson and Co. and had been renamed Gladstone, after the politician William Ewart Gladstone.

The factory opened as a museum in 1974, the buildings having been saved from demolition in 1970 when the pottery closed (some ten years after its bottle ovens were last fired). In the 1990s ownership passed to Stoke-on-Trent City Council.

The museum has shown its commitment to industrial heritage by functioning as a working pottery. However, production has had to be curtailed for financial reasons and the museum is therefore less of a "living" museum than it was.  As at 2014 the Middleport Pottery in Burslem, which is used for commercial production, is arguably the only working Victorian pottery in the city of Stoke-on-Trent.

Process of making table-ware
The clay and ground bone were mixed in the sliphouse. Bowls,  plates and saucers were pressed, jiggered and jolleyed or moulded from the slip. The green (un-fired) china was left to dry in the greenhouse. At the same time the saggars that would hold them in the kiln were made.

The bottle oven kiln is protected by an outer hovel, which helps to create an updraught. The biscuit kiln was filled with clay sealed saggars of green (un-fired) flatwares (bedded in flint) by placers. The doors (clammins) were bricked up and the firing began. Each firing took 14 tons of coal. Fires were lit in the firemouths and baited every four hours, flames  rose up inside the kilns, heat passed between the bungs of saggars. They controlled the temperature of the firing using dampers in the crown. The temperature was gauged by watching the contraction of bullers rings (a pyrometric device placed in the kiln). A kiln would be fired to 1250C.

The biscuitwares are glazed. They fired again in the bigger glost kilns- again they are placed in sealed saggars, items separated by kiln furniture such as stints, saddles and thimbles. The table-ware would then be decorated by transfers or by painting and placed in the muffle kiln.

The enamel kiln (or muffle kiln) is of different construction- it fired at 700C.
The pots were stacked on 7 or 8 levels of clay bats (shelves). The door was iron lined with brick.

When the kiln cooled the product was transported in basket and exported to different parts of the country and empire using the canal network and the ports on the River Mersey.

Buildings
The museum is centred on the Roslyn pottery. It contains two biscuit ovens and two larger glost ovens. In addition are two enamel kilns. A tandem compound steam engine by Marshall & Sons, of Gainsborough, Lincolnshire is in place but it is turned by an electric motor. The two muffle kilns came from elsewhere.

Displays
The museum allows the visitor to explore the bottle kilns and exhibits the principal ancillary rooms: the engine house, the slip room, saggar making workshop. It shows aspects of working with clay- including hands on displays of throwing, moulding and decorating. Colour and gilding is presented as interpretive panels.

There is a gallery explaining the history of the tile: how it was pressed glazed and decorated. In one tableau the "Gladstone Vase" by Frederick Alfred Rhead is displayed. 

There is also a gallery charting the history of sanitary ware, privies, earth closets and water closets.

Media interest
Gladstone has seen its share of celebrity interest, from Tony Robinson filming for a BBC documentary 'The Worst Jobs in Britain' and from Alan Titchmarsh. It also has regular visits from the Blue Peter crew, and numerous children's TV programmes. In 1986, parts 13 and 14 of the Doctor Who serial The Trial of a Time Lord were shot at the museum. In the early 1990s it was featured on Noel's House Party with a live 'gunging' outside of the bottle kilns.

Gladstone pottery museum was featured on Living TV's popular series, "Most Haunted".

The museum featured in the third episode of the BBC One programme 24 Hours in the Past featuring six celebrities working in the Victorian era. The episode aired on 12 May 2015.

Since 2020,  latter series' of The Great Pottery Throwdown have been filmed there (having moved from Middleport Pottery )

In 2021, it was used as a regular location for both Netflix TV Series The Irregulars based on the characters from the Arthur Conan Doyle Sherlock Holmes novels and The Colour Room about the local Pottery designer Clarice Cliff.

Celebrations and events

The museum holds annual events from Halloween ghosts walks and tours, to Christmas Carol Concerts and seasonal festivals. It also caters for children with Egg Easter Hunts and Summer Pottery workshops.

See also
 Burleigh Pottery

References
Notes

Footnotes

Bibliography

External links 

 
The Gladstone China backstamp
Roslyn Ware
Potbank Dictionary Archived for the British Library.
Royal Stafford Guide to making Tableware 
Rosenthal Porcelain production methods

Decorative arts museums in England
Grade II* listed buildings in Staffordshire
Grade II* listed museum buildings
Industry museums in England
Museums in Stoke-on-Trent
English pottery
Ceramics museums in the United Kingdom
Museums established in 1974
1974 establishments in England
Art museums and galleries in Staffordshire
Staffordshire pottery
Industrial archaeological sites in England